T. J. Edwards (born August 12, 1996) is an American football linebacker for the Chicago Bears of the National Football League (NFL). He played college football at Wisconsin.

High school
Edwards played quarterback at Lakes Community High School in Lake Villa, IL. His senior year, he also played three games at Safety. In his three games on defense, he posted 20 tackles, 2 TFLs, 2 sacks and an interception.

Recruiting
Despite playing quarterback in high school he recruited for college football as a defensive player. Edwards was originally committed to Western Michigan. However, in early December 2013 Edwards flipped his commitment to Wisconsin after being recruited by Wisconsin's defensive coordinator Dave Aranda.

College career

Edwards attended the University of Wisconsin-Madison where he played inside linebacker for the Wisconsin Badgers football team.

2014
Edwards redshirted his freshman year. At the end of the season the team was preparing to play against Auburn in the Outback Bowl. The younger players on the team received extra reps and UW's defensive coordinator Dave Aranda praised Edwards, saying "He was the MVP of that period, in my opinion."

2015
With 2014 starting inside linebackers Marcus Trotter and Derek Landisch graduating and needing to be replaced Edwards was thrown in the mix to become a starter. After spring practice Edwards had earned the starting role alongside Leon Jacobs.

In his redshirt freshman year Edwards started all 13 games. In the season opener Edwards tallied 12 tackles against Alabama. The next three games however he only recorded ten tackles. October 19 Edwards was named Big Ten freshman of the week for his performance against Purdue where he had 16 tackles, 1.5 tackles-for-loss and one forced fumble.

For the season Edwards led the team in tackles, recording 84, 6.5 tackles-for-loss and one forced fumble. At the end of the season Edwards was named to the Football Writers Association of America Freshman All-American team. He was also named honorable mention All-Big Ten by the coaches.

College statistics

Professional career

Philadelphia Eagles
After going undrafted in the 2019 NFL Draft, Edwards signed with the Philadelphia Eagles on May 9, 2019. After making the Eagles final roster to begin 2019, he played in all 16 games with four starts.

On October 8, 2020, Edwards was placed on injured reserve after suffering a hamstring injury in Week 4. He was activated on October 31, 2020.
In Week 8 against the Dallas Cowboys on Sunday Night Football, Edwards recorded a team high 13 tackles and recorded a strip sack on quarterback Ben DiNucci which was recovered and returned by teammate Rodney McLeod for a 53 yard touchdown during the 23–9 win.
In Week 17 against the Washington Football Team on Sunday Night Football, Edwards recorded his first career interception off a pass thrown by Alex Smith during the 20–14 loss.

During a Week 5 game against the Carolina Panthers on October 10, 2021, Edwards made a crucial play when he blocked a punt as the Eagles were down 18-13 in the fourth quarter. The Eagles would go on to win the game, 21-18. Edwards was named the NFC Special Teams Player of the Week for his performance.

Following a strong performance in their Week 11 game against the New Orleans Saints, in which Edwards recorded both an interception and a fumble recovery, the Philadelphia Eagles and Edwards agreed to a one-year extension worth  $3.2 million.

In 2022, Edwards helped the Eagles reach Super Bowl LVII where they lost 38-35 to the Kansas City Chiefs. In the Super Bowl, Edwards had 6 tackles and 1 pass defended.

Chicago Bears
On March 15, 2023, Edwards signed a three-year, 19.5 million dollar contract with his hometown team, the Chicago Bears.

NFL career statistics

Personal life
Edwards is a Christian. He is engaged to Kelly Jo.

References

External links
Philadelphia Eagles bio
Wisconsin Badgers bio

1996 births
Living people
People from Lake Villa, Illinois
Players of American football from Illinois
Sportspeople from the Chicago metropolitan area
American football linebackers
Wisconsin Badgers football players
Philadelphia Eagles players
Chicago Bears players